The Oxford Book of Modern Science Writing is an anthology of scientific writings, arranged and introduced by Richard Dawkins of the University of Oxford. Published first in March 2008, it contains 83 writings on many topics from a diverse variety of authors, which range in length from one to eight pages. All inclusions are dated post-1900, and include poetry, anecdotes, and general philosophical musings.

Contents
The book is divided into four segments. The following is a list of pieces included in each segment.

What Scientists Study
from:
The Mysterious Universe by James Jeans
Just Six Numbers by Martin Rees
Creation Revisited by Peter Atkins
The Ant and the Peacock by Helena Cronin
The Genetical Theory of Natural Selection by R. A. Fisher
Mankind Evolving by Theodosius Dobzhansky
Adaptation and Natural Selection by G. C. Williams
Life Itself: Its Origin and Nature by Francis Crick
Genome by Matt Ridley
"Theoretical Biology in the Third Millennium" by Sydney Brenner
The Language of the Genes by Steve Jones
"On Being the Right Size", an essay by J. B. S. Haldane
The Explanation of Organic Diversity by Mark Ridley
"The Importance of the Nervous System in the Evolution of Animal Flight" by John Maynard Smith
Man in the Universe by Fred Hoyle
On Growth and Form by D'Arcy Thompson
The Meaning of Evolution by G. G. Simpson
Trilobite! by Richard Fortey
The Mind Machine by Colin Blakemore
Mirrors in Mind by Richard Gregory
"One Self: A Meditation on the Unity of Consciousness" by Nicholas Humphrey
The Language Instinct and How the Mind Works by Steven Pinker
The Rise and Fall of the Third Chimpanzee by Jared Diamond
The Life of the Robin by David Lack
Curious Naturalists by Niko Tinbergen
Social Evolution by Robert Trivers
The Open Sea by Alister Hardy
The Sea Around Us by Rachel Carson
"How Flowers Changed the World" by Loren Eiseley
The Diversity of Life by Edward O. Wilson

Who Scientists Are
from:
The Expanding Universe by Arthur Eddington
 the foreword to G. H. Hardy's A Mathematician's Apology by C. P. Snow
 Disturbing the Universe by Freeman Dyson
 'War and the Nations' by J. Robert Oppenheimer
'A Passion for Crystals' by Max F. Perutz
'Said Ryle to Hoyle' by Barbara and George Gamow
'Cancer's a Funny Thing' by J. B. S. Haldane
 The Identity of Man by Jacob Bronowski
 'Science and Literature', 'Darwin's Illness', 'The Phenomenon of Man', the postscript to 'Lucky Jim', and 'D' Arcy Thompson and Growth and Form' by Peter Medawar
 Self-Made Man by Jonathan Kingdon
 Origins Reconsidered by Richard Leakey and Roger Lewin
 Lucy by Donald C. Johanson and Maitland A. Edey
'Worm for a Century', and 'All Seasons' by Stephen Jay Gould
 Life Cycles by John Tyler Bonner
 Uncle Tungsten by Oliver Sacks
'Seven Wonders' by Lewis Thomas
 Avoid Boring People by James Watson
 What Mad Pursuit by Francis Crick
 The Unnatural Nature of Science by Lewis Wolpert
 Essays of a Biologist by Julian Huxley
'Religion and Science' by Albert Einstein
 The Demon-Haunted World by Carl Sagan

What Scientists Think
from:
 The Character of Physical Law by Richard Feynman
 What Is Life? by Erwin Schrödinger
 Darwin's Dangerous Idea and Consciousness Explained by Daniel Dennett
 The Growth of Biological Thought by Ernst Mayr
 'The Tragedy of the Commons' by Garrett Hardin
 Geometry for the Selfish Herd and Narrow Roads of Geneland by W. D. Hamilton
 How Nature Works by Per Bak
 "The Fantastic Combinations of John Conway's New Solitaire Game 'Life'" by Martin Gardner
 Mathematics for the Million by Lancelot Hogben
 "The Miraculous Jar" in From Here to Infinity by Ian Stewart
 "The Mathematical Theory of Communication" by Claude E. Shannon and Warren Weaver
 "Computing Machinery and Intelligence" by Alan Turing
 'What is the Theory of Relativity?' by Albert Einstein
 Mr Tompkins by George Gamow
 The Goldilocks Enigma by Paul Davies
 The Time and Space of Uncle Albert by Russell Stannard
 The Elegant Universe by Brian Greene
 A Brief History of Time by Stephen Hawking

What Scientists Delight In
from:
 Truth and Beauty by S. Chandrasekhar
 A Mathematician's Apology by G. H. Hardy
 Dreams of a Final Theory by Steven Weinberg
 The Life of the Cosmos by Lee Smolin
 The Emperor's New Mind by Roger Penrose
 Godel, Escher, Bach: An Eternal Golden Braid by Douglas Hofstadter
 Geons, Black Holes, and Quantum Foam by John Archibald Wheeler and Kenneth Ford listing
 The Fabric of Reality by David Deutsch
 The Periodic Table by Primo Levi
 Life: An Unauthorized Biography by Richard Fortey
 The Meaning of Evolution by George Gaylord Simpson
 Little Men and Flying Saucers by Loren Eiseley
 Pale Blue Dot by Carl Sagan

Critical response
The book received extremely favourable reviews, with New Scientist proclaiming that "if you could only ever read one science book, this should probably be it". Peter Forbes of The Independent praised Dawkins' inclusions, stating that "every reader is likely to make a discovery or two". Steven Poole in The Guardian described it as "a beautiful volume" and "a labour of love" on Dawkins' part.
A number of science bloggers did criticise the lack of women scientists included in the book.

Notes and references

2008 non-fiction books
Science books
Works by Richard Dawkins
Science studies
Oxford University Press books